21 Thunder is a Canadian television drama series which follows star players of an under-21 academy for the fictional Montreal Thunder soccer team in Montreal, Quebec. The series was created by Adrian Wills, Riley Adams, and Kenneth Hirsch in 2016. It features an ensemble cast that includes, among others, RJ Fetherstonhaugh, Colm Feore, Stephanie Bennett, Emmanuel Kabongo, and Conrad Pla. The series aired in Canada on CBC Television beginning July 31, 2017, to generally positive reviews.

21 Thunder was released in all other countries worldwide on March 1, 2018 as a Netflix Original Series by Netflix although it was removed in March 2022. It received generally positive international reception.

Background 
The creators of the show—Adrian Wills, Riley Adams, and Kenneth Hirsch—briefly considered focusing their series on basketball or hockey, before settling on soccer. Hirsch explained this decision in an interview with the Montreal Gazette:We realized very quickly that every Canadian can relate one way or another to soccer. Either you play it or you watch it ... Also, look at any soccer field across Canada and that field reflects huge diversity, of cultural background, of different segments of society. In September 2016, CBC announced it had commissioned a one-hour drama series that would follow the star players of an under-21 soccer academy in Montreal. The series was filmed on location, in Montreal, throughout 2016. Later, in a press release, CBC stated that the series will "offer audiences a fresh and diverse perspective on the world's most popular sport."

Cast

Main 
RJ Fetherstonhaugh as Nolan Gallard
 Stephanie Bennett as Christy Cook 
 Emmanuel Kabongo as Junior Lolo 
 Andres Joseph as Alex el Haddadi 
 Conrad Pla as Albert Rocas 
 Ryan Pierce as Davey Gunn 
 Clark Backo as Emma Lavigueur 
 Eileen Li as Lara Yun

Recurring 
 Kyle Mac as Special K 
 Colm Feore as Declan Gallard 
 Kevin Claydon as Stefan Arnaud 
 Jonathan Kim as James Tran 
 Kimberly Laferriere as Marie Tremblay 
 Gabrielle Graham as Fatima Gossa
 Thamela Mpumlwana as Sly Lolo 
 Cristina Rosato as Ana Messina

Episodes

Reception 
Upon its release in Canada, the series received generally positive reviews; John Doyle of The Globe and Mail called it "highly enjoyable and addictive, even if you're just a casual soccer fan." Further, Doyle wrote that "It's an excellent melodrama that reaches into the lavishly exotic and coarse world of club soccer and pulls out stories and characters that are believable and compelling. ...it's not the male-centric drama you might expect. There is a sharp edge to the female characters. Mostly it is fast, action-packed, sort-of realistic and gripping. It's fine entertainment, and it's one of those dramas about sports that succeeds."

After the fourth episode, Greg David of TV, eh? wrote: "I said off the top how pleasantly surprised I've been with 21 Thunder's first season. The writing is taut and the characters are anything but cookie-cutter; 21 Thunder has turned into my sleeper hit of the summer."

Johanna Schneller of the Toronto Star wrote a less enthusiastic review, in which she claimed that the series "has promise, but not many kicks," concluding that "the show is freshest when it keeps its head in the game."

With its international launch on Netflix in March 2017, Vanity Fair included 21 Thunder in its "A-List: What to Watch in March". In her review of April 3, 2018, Rebecca Farley of Refinery29 calls 21 Thunder "Canada's answer to the Gossip Girl, and writes of the characters: "Now that they're all approaching 21, they have to either launch professional soccer careers or pivot into something more sustainable. Ergo, internal conflict. Ergo, external conflict. Ergo, sexual relations catalyzed by external conflict. The soccer shirts will be removed, declarations of love will happen on porches (and in the physical therapy room, and on the soccer field), and, heck, an arsonist might make a guest appearance! This show really does have everything, including a much-needed dose of diversity."

References

External links 
 
 

CBC Television original programming
Fictional association football television series
2017 Canadian television series debuts
2010s Canadian drama television series
Soccer on Canadian television
Television shows set in Montreal
Television shows filmed in Montreal